Feliciano may refer to:

People
Feliciano (name), including a list of people with the name

Places
San José de Feliciano, Argentine city
Feliciano River, river in Argentina
Estadio Feliciano Gambarte, stadium in Argentina 
Dom Feliciano, municipality in Brazil